Claude Schnitzler (born in 1949) is a French organist and conductor.

Career 
Born in Strasbourg, Schnitzler studied music at the Conservatoire de Strasbourg (organ, harpsichord, conducting, and writing) before completing his training as a conductor at the Mozarteum University Salzburg while giving numerous organ recitals in France and abroad. In 1971, he was appointed titular organist of the great organ of the Strasbourg Cathedral.

He joined the Opéra national du Rhin in 1972 as a singing conductor and in 1975 became Alain Lombard's assistant at the Orchestre philharmonique de Strasbourg and at the Opéra national du Rhin, where he has since conducted numerous shows.

From 1981 to 1985, he collaborated regularly with the Paris Opera, where he conducted opera and ballet shows at both the Palais Garnier and the Salle Favart.

In 1986, he took over the direction of the Orchestra of the city of Rennes, combining this position with that of permanent conductor of the Opéra national du Rhin.

Repertoire 
He divides his time between the opera and the symphonic concert, where the traditional repertoire blends with the contemporary one. He directed the creation of Jean Prodromidès's Goya in Montpellier and Marseille; the French premiere of Britten's Owen Wingrave (at the Opéra du Rhin).

In the summer of 1999, he was the guest of the Edinburgh Festival with the Scottish Chamber Orchestra. More recently, he has conducted Die Fledermaus at the Welsh National Opera of Cardiff, Hoffman's La Vie parisienne, The tales of Hoffmann, Der Wildschütz, Carmen, Roméo et Juliette in Leipzig, where he is a permanent guest conductor, as well as Alfred Bruneau's Le Rêve with the Orchestre national de France, Adrienne Lecouvreur in Lausanne, La Périchole in Nancy and Montpellier, Chabrier's Gwendoline and The Flying Dutchman in Rennes, Carmen and Eine Nacht in Venedig at the Volksoper de Vienna, Ariadne auf Naxos in Nice, Swan Lake with the Leipzig Gewandhaus Orchestra.

He made a remarkable debut at the Vienna State Opera in Gounod's Roméo et Juliette and was immediately re-employed there for the coming seasons: La Bohème, Lucia di Lammermoor, Roméo et Juliette, The Tales of Hoffmann, L'elisir d'amore, Massenet's Manon and Bizet's Carmen. Other projects include Dukas' Ariane et Barbe-Bleue in Nice, Smetana's The Bartered Bride and Die Fledermaus at the Vienna State Opera, La Traviata in Metz, The Tales of Hoffmann in Rennes, The Flying Dutchman in Dijon and symphonic concerts, in particular with the Orchestre symphonique et lyrique de Nancy. At the Opéra du Rhin, he has directed numerous productions, the most recent of which are Offenbach's Barbe-Bleue, Verdi's Rigoletto, Bartók's Bluebeard's Castle and Martinů's Ariane .

Bibliography 
 Marcel Thomann, 'Claude Schnitzler', vol. 34, p. 3514 and vol. 47, p. 4930

External links 
 Claude Schniztler (Flâneries musicales de Reims)
 Claude Schniztler's performances
 Schnitzler (Forum opera)
 Claude Scnitzler
 Claude Scnitzler (Opera musica)
 Selected discography (Discogs)
 Oboe Concerto in D Major conductor Claude Schnitzler] (YouTube)

1949 births
Living people
Musicians from Strasbourg
French male conductors (music)
French classical organists
French male organists
20th-century French conductors (music)
21st-century French conductors (music)
21st-century organists
20th-century French male musicians
21st-century French male musicians
Male classical organists